Colclough (variant Coleclough) is a surname of English origin. It is derived from a place called Cowclough in Whitworth, Lancashire.

Notable people with this surname include:

Sir Adam Colclough, 1st Baronet (c.1590–1637) of the Colclough baronets
Sir Caesar Colclough, 2nd Baronet (1624–1684), Member of Parliament for Newcastle-under-Lyme
Sir Caesar Colclough, 3rd Baronet (c.1650–1687) of the Colclough baronets
Caesar Colclough (died 1726), Member of Parliament for Taghmon
Caesar Colclough (1696–1766), Member of Parliament for Wexford County
Caesar Colclough (1754–1822), Chief Justice in Court of Appeal of Newfoundland and Labrador
Caesar Colclough (1766–1842), Member of Parliament for Wexford County
Christopher Colclough (1946-2017), British development economist and academic
Craig Colclough, American opera singer
Dave Colclough (1964–2016), Welsh poker player
Ephraim Colclough (1875–1914), English footballer
Graham Colclough (1883-1954), Australian rules footballer
Horace Colclough (1888-1976), English footballer and manager
Jim Colclough (1936–2004), American football player
John Henry Colclough (c.1769–1798), Irish revolutionary
Katie Colclough (born 1990), English cyclist
Mary Ann Colclough (1836–1885), New Zealand feminist and social reformer
Maurice Colclough  (1953–2006), English rugby player
Michael Colclough (born 1944), Church of England clergyman
Pauline Adams (née Colclough; 1874-1957), Irish-American suffragist
Phil Colclough (1940-2019), English folk singer and songwriter
Ricardo Colclough (born 1983), American gridiron football player
Ryan Colclough (born 1994), English footballer
Tom Colclough, Canadian musician
William Colclough (died c.1414), Member of Parliament for Newcastle-under-Lyme

See also

Footnotes